Rohanpur or Rahanpur is a town and paurashava (municipality) in Chapai Nawabganj District of Rajshahi Division. The town is the headquarter and urban centre of Gomastapur Upazila.

References

Populated places in Rajshahi Division